Ashwiny Iyer Tiwari (born 15 October 1979) is an Indian filmmaker and writer. After working in advertising for several years, she made her debut by directing the 2016 comedy drama Nil Battey Sannata. The film garnered mixed reviews and Tiwari went on to direct its Tamil remake entitled Amma Kanakku. She had previously served as the Executive Creative Director at Leo Burnett before she moved on to pursue a filmmaking career. Tiwari won the Filmfare Award for Best Director for the 2017 romantic comedy Bareilly Ki Barfi.

Early life and background
Ashwiny Iyer was born on 15 October 1979 in a Tamil speaking family and grew up in the suburb of Mulund, Mumbai. She studied at St. Mary's Convent High School, Mulund and did her higher studies from SIES College of Commerce and Economics. She is married to writer-director Nitesh Tiwari.

Career

Advertising
A gold medalist in commercial arts from Sophia Polytechnic, Mumbai, Ashwiny spent 15 years in the advertising agency Leo Burnett (India). She won several awards like Cannes Lions, New York festival, One show, Promax and the Goafest Awards. She quit Leo Burnett to follow her passion in filmmaking.

Films
Iyer made her first short film What's for Breakfast in 2012. In 2016, she made her feature film debut with the comedy drama Nil Battey Sannata starring Swara Bhaskar. which was produced by Colour Yellow productions (Aanand L Rai) in association with Jar Pictures and Opticus Inc. and presented by Eros International . It was inspired by a contestant in Kaun Banega Crorepati hosted by Mr. Amitabh Bachchan which inspired many Indian viewers.
 Released under the title of The New Classmate internationally, the film garnered critical acclaim and Tiwari was praised for her direction and sensitive handling of the subject matter. She remade the film in Tamil as Amma Kanakku which released on 24 June in the same year.

She was selected as one of the "Powerful Women in 2016" in the Femina poll and was a part of Grazia Women Achievers 2016. She was a speaker at Tedx Bangalore 2016 on women, films and self-empowerment. In 2017, she won a Filmfare Award for Best Debut Director.

Iyer next directed the 2017 romantic comedy Bareilly Ki Barfi, for which she won the Filmfare Award for Best Director at the 2018 ceremony. The film received praise mainly for it's humorous dialogue and the acting of the lead cast. The film went onto become a commercial success. Devesh Sharma praised the film in his four stars out of five for Filmfare; he praised Tiwari for her versatility and wrote that the film, "will give you ample laughs throughout and you’ll walk away from the theatre with a satisfied smile on your face." She signed a two-film deal with Ekta Kapoor 's Balaji Motion Pictures from which one she will direct and another she will produce along with Ekta.

In 2018, Iyer teamed up with Kangana Ranaut, Neena Gupta, Richa Chadda and Jassie Gill to make Panga, a film about a new-age family that challenges stereotypes. The film released on 24 January 2020 and was critically acclaimed.

She turned author with her debut fiction novel, titled Mapping Love which released on 1 August 2021 to glowing reviews.

Iyer is the co-founder of the production house, Earthsky Pictures, under which she has produced Break Point, a docu-series based on Tennis legends, Leander Paes and Mahesh Bhupathi, and several ad films.

She is also directing the life story of Mr. Narayan Murthy and Mrs. Sudha Murthy.

Filmography

Awards and honours

References

External links

1979 births
Living people
21st-century Indian film directors
Film directors from Mumbai
Women writers from Maharashtra
Hindi-language film directors
Tamil-language film directors
Indian women screenwriters
Indian women film directors
Screenwriters from Mumbai
Filmfare Awards winners
Zee Cine Awards winners